Georg Schwanhardt the Elder (1601-1667) was a German glass-engraver and rock crystal engraver, and the founder of the Nuremberg school of engravers. He was a student of Caspar Lehmann and upon Lehmann's death inherited his exclusive patent for engraving glass. His engravings often portray miniature landscapes adorned with formal scrollwork.

References 
 Encyclopedia Britannica article
 Oxford Reference entry
 Deutsche Biographie entry

Glass engravers
German glass artists
1601 births
1667 deaths
17th-century German artists